On the Rocks  is the debut studio album by American country music band Midland. It was released on September 22, 2017 via Big Machine Records. In 2019 it was certified Gold by RIAA for selling 500,000 units.

Content
The album features 13 songs, including the singles "Drinkin' Problem", "Make a Little", and "Burn Out". At least one band member wrote every song on the album. Josh Osborne, Shane McAnally, and Dann Huff served as producers.

Critical reception
Allmusic reviewer Stephen Thomas Erlewine rated the album 4 out of 5 stars, comparing its sound favorably to Alabama and Dwight Yoakam. He also stated that "the three members construct sturdy songs with a shimmering surface to match." Chris Richards of The Washington Post described the album as "the year's best country album".  Exclaim! writer Marlo Ashley gave the album a 9 out of 10, comparing "Lonely For You Only" to Sonny James. She also called the album "charming".

Commercial performance
The album debuted at No. 1 on the Top Country Albums chart, selling 17,000 copies (20,000 units including streams and tracks) in the first week. It has sold 112,500 copies in the United States as of March 2019. In November 2019 it was certified Gold by RIAA for selling 500,000 units.

Track listing

Personnel
Adapted from On the Rocks liner notes.
Midland
 Jess Carson - acoustic guitar (all tracks), background vocals (all tracks)
 Cameron Duddy - bass guitar (all tracks), background vocals (all tracks)
 Mark Wystrach - lead vocals (all tracks)

Additional musicians
Vinnie Ciesielski - trumpet (track 4)
Dan Dugmore - steel guitar (tracks 3, 8, 9, 12)
Ian Fitchuk - piano (tracks 3, 9)
Paul Franklin - steel guitar (tracks 1–7, 9-11, 13), steel guitar solo (track 3)
Dann Huff - acoustic guitar (tracks 2, 5, 7, 8, 10, 12), electric guitar (all tracks except 12), guitar solo (tracks 6, 8, 9), gut string guitar (track 1), 12-string acoustic guitar (track 3), wire choir guitar solo (track 10), high-strung guitar (track 12), ganjo (track 13), mandolin (tracks 2, 8), Hammond B-3 organ (track 3)
David Huff - tambourine (track 1), percussion (tracks 2, 6, 7, 13)
Charlie Judge - accordion (track 13), keyboards (tracks 1, 2, 4-13)
Rob McNelley - electric guitar (tracks 9, 12)
Gordon Mote - piano (track 10)
Greg Morrow - drums (all tracks), percussion (track 7)
Danny Rader - acoustic guitar (track 3), mandolin (track 3), bouzouki (track 3)
Mickey Raphael - echo harp (track 7), harmonica (track 13)
Ilya Toshinsky - acoustic guitar (track 12)
Derek Wells - electric guitar (except track 12), guitar solo (tracks 2, 11, 12), 12-string electric guitar (track 12), baritone guitar (track 12)

Technical
Ryan Gore - recording (track 9)
Dann Huff - producer
David Huff - digital editing (except track 3)
Steve Marcontonio - recording (except track 3)
Shane McAnally - producer
Andrew Mendelson - mastering
Seth Morton - recording (track 3)
Sean Neff - digital editing (track 3)
Justin Niebank - recording (track 3), mixing
Josh Osborne - producer
Chris Small - digital editing (except track 3)

Charts

Weekly charts

Year-end charts

Singles

Notes

Certifications

References 

2017 debut albums
Big Machine Records albums
Midland (band) albums
Albums produced by Shane McAnally
Albums produced by Dann Huff